Many vessels have held the name of Diana.  They include:

Merchant vessels
 , of 288 tons burthen, was launched at Newbury. Between 1785 and 1794 she was a British whaling ship, based in Hull. She then became a transport and a Baltic trader and was last listed in 1801.
  was launched as a West Indiaman. From 1805 she made four voyages as an East Indiaman under charter to the British East India Company. She made a fifth voyage to India in 1817 under a license from the EIC. She ran into difficulties in the Hooghly River while homeward bound and was condemned in Bengal in June 1818.
  was launched as a West Indiaman. In 1802 she wrecked on the Isle of Pines, Cuba.
 , a merchant vessel built at Cochin that wrecked in 1820 while participating in a punitive expedition against pirates at Ras al Khaimah
  was a steam paddle steamer built as a merchant vessel and purchased by the Bengal Government in 1824. During the First Anglo-Burmese War she became the first steam-powered warship of the Honourable East India Company to see action. She was transferred to the Burmese Government in 1826 and to back to the company for use by Singapore in 1837.
  was built at Whitby, England. She made a number of voyages between England, India and Quebec with cargo and undertook one voyage transporting convicts to New South Wales. She was last listed in 1848.
 , whaling ship, home port in Hull
She took part in the 1892 Dundee Whaling Expedition to the Antarctic.
 Diana (HBC vessel), built in 1880, see Hudson's Bay Company vessels

Naval vessels
  - any of 10 ships of the Royal Navy 
 , an aviso of the Italian Regia Marina
  was a frigateship of 4 guns the Dutch Navy purchased in 1799. The British Royal Navy captured her in 1804
 , an early 19th-century navy vessel
 , a cruiser of the Imperial Russian Navy

Diana